Tamanna Vyas is an Indian actress who works in Odia film industry. She made her debut in the movie Joker opposite actor Papu Pom Pom in 2015. She has been selected in the Top-10 list of the Miss Diva - 2018 in Mumbai.

Early life 
Tamanna was born and grew up in Berhampur. She did her schooling and college education from her hometown Berhampur. She is a graduate in Bachelor of Business Administration. She came to limelight after winning the TV reality show 'Raja Queen' and came as runners up in another reality show 'Mu Bi Hebi Heroine' in 2015.

Career 
Tamanna got her first break in a comedy film 'Joker' opposite actor Papu Pom Pom, which was not released yet. She has acted recently in numerous films like ‘Bhaina Kana Kala Se’ opposite Balakrushna,‘Nijhum Ratira Sathi’ opposite Jyoti Ranjan Nayak and these three films directed by the director Sanjay Nayak. In 2018, she has shared the screen with Anubhav Mohanty in the film 'Prem Kumar: Salesman of the year' and with Ardhendu in 'Blackmail'.

Filmography

References 

1996 births
Living people
Actors from Odisha
Indian film actresses
Ollywood
People from Ganjam district